The Australian Antarctic Territory (AAT) is a part of East Antarctica claimed by Australia as an external territory.  It is administered by the Australian Antarctic Division, an agency of the federal Department of Climate Change, Energy, the Environment and Water. The territory's history dates to a claim on Enderby Land made by the United Kingdom in 1841, which was subsequently expanded and eventually transferred to Australia in 1933. It is the largest territory of Antarctica claimed by any nation by area.  In 1961, the Antarctic Treaty came into force. Article 4 deals with territorial claims, and although it does not renounce or diminish any pre-existing claims to sovereignty, it also does not prejudice the position of Contracting Parties in their recognition or non-recognition of territorial sovereignty. As a result, only four other countries — New Zealand, the United Kingdom, France, and Norway recognise Australia's claim to sovereignty in Antarctica.

Area
The AAT consists of all the islands and territory south of 60°S and between 44°38'E and 160°E, except for Adélie Land (136°E to 142°E), which divides the territory into Western AAT (the larger portion) and Eastern AAT. It is bounded by Queen Maud Land in the West and by Ross Dependency in the East. The Australian Antarctic Territory is the largest of any claims to the continent, and covers nearly 5.9 million square kilometres. This makes up about 42 per cent of Antarctica, and would cover about 80 per cent of Mainland Australia. It also corresponds to roughly twice the size of Queen Maud land, India, Argentina or Kazakhstan.

The territory is mostly inhabited by the staff of research stations. The Australian Antarctic Division administers the area primarily by maintaining three year-round stations—Mawson, Davis, and Casey—which support various research projects.

Subdivisions

The territory is divided into nine districts, which are from west to east:

These regions are split into two separate areas geographically, with George V Land and Oates Land lying to the east of the French Territorial claim of Adélie Land, and all other districts lying to its west.

Exclusive economic zone
Australia claims an exclusive economic zone (EEZ) from the Australian Antarctic Territory. However, the Australian proclamation of an Antarctic EEZ is contested. The effect of Article IV of the 1959 Antarctic Treaty (which prohibits new territorial claims or the extension of existing claims in the Antarctic) would seem to be that an EEZ cannot be claimed in relation to territory to which that Treaty applies (south of 60° South).

Whaling
Whaling in Australian Antarctic territorial waters is controversial and has received international attention. Anti-whaling protest groups, in particular Sea Shepherd Conservation Society, have been active within the Australian Antarctic territorial waters. Sea Shepherd small boat crews have had multiple encounters with Japanese ships that claim to be on research expeditions while opponents argue this is only a "cover" for banned commercial whaling. The Australian Whale Sanctuary, in Australian Antarctic territory, is not recognised by the government of Japan. Anti-whaling legislation passed by the Australian Government applies to Australian territorial waters.  However, Australia's claims of sovereignty over the Australian Antarctic Territory—and thus sovereignty over Australian Antarctic territorial waters—are recognised by only the United Kingdom, New Zealand, France and Norway.

Stations

Active and closed stations in the territory, from West to East:

History
The United Kingdom first claimed Victoria Land on 9 January 1841 and then claimed Enderby Land in 1930. In 1933, a British imperial order transferred most of the territory south of 60° S and between meridians 160° E and 45° E to Australia.

That part of His Majesty's dominions in the Antarctic Seas which comprises all the islands and territories other than Adélie Land which are situated south of the 60th degree of South Latitude and lying between the 160th degree of East Longitude and the 45th degree of East Longitude is hereby placed under the authority of the Commonwealth of Australia.

Australian Antarctic Territory Acceptance Act 1933That part of the territory in the Antarctic seas which comprises all the islands and territories, other than Adelie Land, situated south of the 60th degree south latitude and lying between the 160th degree east longitude and the 45th degree east longitude, is hereby declared to be accepted by the Commonwealth as a Territory under the authority of the Commonwealth, by the name of the Australian Antarctic Territory. 

The borders with Adélie Land were fixed definitively in 1938. In 1947, Britain transferred Heard Island and McDonald Islands to the territory. On 13 February 1954, Mawson Station was established as the first Australian station on the continent proper.

Recognition of Australian sovereignty
Australia's claim to sovereignty over the Australian Antarctic Territory is recognised by the United Kingdom, New Zealand, France and Norway. Japan does not recognise the Australian claim to the Australian Antarctic territorial waters in which Japanese ships conduct whaling.

Mining in Antarctica
During the early 1980s there was a brief debate in Australia on whether or not to allow mining on the mineral-rich continent. Several mining proposals have been discussed and have all been rejected.

On 9 August 2011, influential Australian think-tank, the Lowy Institute, published a report warning Canberra against complacency when it comes to its claim. The global treaty banning resource exploitation becomes reviewable in 2041, and some states may then decide to withdraw from it considering the continent's mineral deposits. These include coal seams, manganese, iron and uranium, while Antarctica's forecast oil reserves are estimated as among the largest in the world after Saudi Arabia and Venezuela. Lowy's national security fellow Ellie Fogarty said in the paper that Australia cannot adequately patrol its claim, lacking the kind of ski-planes it needs to reach some areas.

Postage stamps

Australia issues postage stamps for the Australian Antarctic Territory. The first issues came in 1957, and sporadically thereafter, settling into a pattern of an annual issue by the 1990s. All have been Antarctic-themed, and all are valid for postage in Australia and its territories, including Antarctica.

Telephone connections
Assigned the country calling code +672 1[0-4] XXXX, the four stations and the Aurora Australis operated by the Australian Antarctic Division can be reached by direct calling from anywhere in the world. The area codes are 10 for Davis, 11 for Mawson, 12 for Casey, 13 for Macquarie Island and 14 for Wilkins and the Aurora Australis, in each case followed by four additional digits.

People
As of May 2018 the AAT was believed to have a population of around 80 people during winters and 200 during summers.

See also

 Australian Antarctic Building System

References

External links

 Australian Antarctic Division
 Australian Antarctic Gazetteer

 
Antarctic region
States and territories established in 1933
1933 establishments in Antarctica